The Hu (stylized as The HU) is a Mongolian folk metal band formed in 2016. With traditional Mongolian instrumentation, including the Morin khuur, the Tovshuur, and Mongolian throat singing, the band calls their style of music "hunnu rock", hu inspired by the Hunnu, an ancient Mongol/Turkic empire, known as Hünnü in Mongolia. Some of the band's lyrics include old Mongolian war cries and poetry.

History 
Two videos on YouTube released in late 2018, "Yuve Yuve Yu" (28 September) and "Wolf Totem" (16 November), had together garnered over 161 million views by March 2022. On 11 April 2019, "Wolf Totem" reached No. 1 on Billboards Hard Rock Digital Song Sales, making The Hu the first Mongolian musical act to top a Billboard chart. In addition, "Yuve Yuve Yu" reached No. 7 on the same chart while "Wolf Totem" debuted at No. 22 on Billboards Hot Rock Songs chart.

On 17 May 2019, The Hu met Mongolian President Khaltmaagiin Battulga, who congratulated the band for their accomplishments in promoting the country. On 6 June 2019, the band released the lyric video for their third single "Shoog Shoog". In June and July 2019, they performed twenty-three concerts in twelve European countries. The band released the music video for their fourth single "The Great Chinggis Khaan" on 23 August 2019.

The Gereg (2019–2021)
The Hu released its first album on 13 September 2019. The album's title is The Gereg, which is the term used for a diplomatic passport from the time of Genghis Khan. The Gereg was internationally released under Eleven Seven Records. The band embarked on their first North American tour from September 2019 through December 2019. On October 4, the band released a new version of "Yuve Yuve Yu", featuring new vocals by Danny Case of From Ashes to New. In November, their song "Black Thunder"/"Sugaan Essena" was featured in the video game Star Wars Jedi: Fallen Order. On 13 December, the band released a remix of "Wolf Totem", featuring Papa Roach lead vocalist Jacoby Shaddix. This version will be featured in the upcoming horror film The Retaliators. On 1 May 2020, a remix of "Song of Women" featuring Lzzy Hale of Halestorm was released online.

On 27 November 2019, The Hu were awarded the highest state award for Mongolia, the Order of Genghis Khan, for promoting Mongolian culture around the world. On 28 June 2020, The Hu uploaded their COVID-19 relief effort fundraising concert on YouTube. In an interview before the concert, the band stated they plan to release their second album in 2021. In July, a Simlish version of their song "The Legend of Mother Swan" was featured in the video game The Sims 4 as part of the "Nifty Knitting" stuff pack. On 3 December 2020, the band released a cover version of Metallica's "Sad but True".

In 2020, The Hu were selected as one of 53 artists to participate in Metallica's 30th anniversary album, the Metallica Blacklist. For the album, The Hu provided a cover of "Through the Never" and the album was released on 1 October 2021 although The Hu's version of "Through the Never" was published on Apple Music and Spotify on 10 September 2021. All of the profits of the album are being donated to various charities, with each band providing a cover being able to choose which charity the profits from their song are being donated to. The Hu chose to donate all of the profits from their song to The Giving Day Charity Fund.

In September and October 2021, the band returned to North America for "The Hun Tour", which was their first live performance since the onset of the COVID-19 pandemic, featuring a mix of songs from The Gereg and their then unreleased new studio album Rumble of Thunder.

Rumble of Thunder (2022–present)
On 12 May 2022, The Hu released the single "This Is Mongol". On 8 July, the band released the single "Black Thunder" and announced their second album, Rumble of Thunder, which was released on 2 September.

On 10 February 2023, the band released their music video for "This Is Mongol (Warrior Souls)" featuring William DuVall of Alice in Chains on lead vocals and rhythm guitar.

Personnel

Members
Galbadrakh "Gala" Tsendbaatar – morin khuur, throat singing (2016–present)
Nyamjantsan "Jaya" Galsanjamts – tumur hhuur, tsuur, throat singing (2016–present)
Enkhsaikhan "Enkush" Batjargal – morin khuur, throat singing (2016–present)
Temuulen "Temka" Naranbaatar – tovshuur, backing vocals (2016–present)

Touring members

 Unumunkh "Ono" Maralkhuu – percussion, tumur hhuur, backing vocals (2019–present)
 Jambaldorj "Jamba" Ayush – guitars, backing vocals (2019–present)
 Nyamdavaa "Davaa" Byambaa – bass, backing vocals (2020–present)
 Odbayar "Odko" Gantumur – drums (2019–present)

Former touring members
 Batkhuu Batbayar – bass, backing vocals (2019–2020)

Discography

Studio albums

Singles

Music videos

References

External links

 
 

Mongolian heavy metal musical groups
2016 establishments in Mongolia
Folk metal musical groups
Musical groups established in 2016
Musical quartets